"It Takes a Thief" may refer to:

Films
 The Challenge (1960 film), a British crime film 
 It Takes a Thief (film), a 1999 Hong Kong film featuring Yukari Oshima

TV
 It Takes a Thief (1968 TV series), an American action/adventure television series starring Robert Wagner
 It Takes a Thief (1979 TV series), a Hong Kong television series
 It Takes a Thief (2005 TV series), an American reality television series
 "It Takes a Thief", a 2003 episode of The Proud Family

Music
 It Takes a Thief (album), a 1994 album by Coolio
 It Takes a Thief, a 2010 compilation album by Thievery Corporation